Glen Douglas Pearson (born December 26, 1950) is a politician in Ontario, Canada. He is a former Member of Parliament for London North Centre, and is a member of the Liberal Party of Canada.

Life and career
Pearson was born in Calgary, Alberta. He is a professional firefighter in London, Ontario, well known for his charitable and humanitarian activities.  He retired as a captain in the London Fire Department, where he worked for 29 years, but he is perhaps better known as the paid executive director of the London Food Bank for over 25 years. He has also previously been involved in the Ontario Association of Food Banks as a board member, serving one term as Chairperson.

Since 1998, along with his wife, Jane Roy, Pearson has worked on human rights and development projects in Sudan. This work included building schools and infrastructure, general community development and campaigning against slavery.

On August 15, 2007, Pearson reunited his Sudanese born adoptive daughter, Abuk Roy, with her twin sister, Achan and brother Ater, who were previously thought to be dead.

Politics

Pearson originally stood as the Liberal candidate in London—Fanshawe in the general election of January 23, 2006, losing to Irene Mathyssen of the New Democratic Party.

Following the resignation of Joe Fontana in London North Centre, he was elected in the resulting by-election on November 27, 2006. His closest competition was Green Party of Canada leader Elizabeth May, who received 26% of the vote.

His campaign emphasized environmental, health care and accountability issues.

He supported Stéphane Dion in the  Liberal leadership election, and introduced him on the night of the candidate speeches.

Pearson was re-elected in the 2008 federal election, but was defeated by Conservative Susan Truppe when he ran for re-election in 2011.

Electoral record

References

External links

1950 births
Canadian firefighters
Canadian humanitarians
Liberal Party of Canada MPs
Living people
Members of the House of Commons of Canada from Ontario
Members of the United Church of Canada
Politicians from Calgary
Politicians from London, Ontario
21st-century Canadian politicians